The King William County Courthouse is a courthouse located in the town of King William, King William County, Virginia.  The original courthouse structure was constructed in 1725; it is the oldest courthouse building in continuous use in the United States.  The courthouse is constructed of brick laid in Flemish bond. In 1840 the courthouse was enlarged and a brick wall was erected to enclose the court green and to keep livestock and poultry away from the buildings.  A new courthouse complex has been constructed to augment the old; however, hearings are still held in the old building to preserve its historic designation.

This courthouse was listed on the National Register of Historic Places in 1969.
 However, the courthouse in Chester of Delaware County, Pennsylvania dates back to 1724 and will likely become more significant as the county just voted for a 99-year lease with a vote of 4-0 (July, 2021).

Gallery

References

External links

King William County Courthouse & Stable, State Route 619, King William, King William County, VA: 6 photos, 7 measured drawings, and 2 data pages at Historic American Buildings Survey

Historic American Buildings Survey in Virginia
Government buildings completed in 1725
Buildings and structures in King William County, Virginia
County courthouses in Virginia
Courthouses on the National Register of Historic Places in Virginia
National Register of Historic Places in King William County, Virginia
1725 establishments in Virginia